The Midnight Prince (French: Prince de minuit) is a 1934 French musical comedy film directed by René Guissart and starring Henri Garat, Edith Méra and Monique Rolland.

The film's sets were designed by the art director Jacques Colombier.

Synopsis
A Paris music shop assistant is employed at night by a nightclub to pretend to be a famous foreign prince in order to drum up business. Things become complicated when he is confused with a real foreign royal.

Cast

References

Bibliography 
 Dayna Oscherwitz & MaryEllen Higgins. The A to Z of French Cinema. Scarecrow Press, 2009.

External links 
 

1934 films
1934 musical comedy films
French musical comedy films
1930s French-language films
Films directed by René Guissart
Films set in Paris
Films scored by Maurice Yvain
French black-and-white films
1930s French films